David Ritchie Machemer (born May 24, 1951) is an American former professional baseball player, scout, and minor league manager. He played in Major League Baseball as a second baseman from 1978 to 1979 for the California Angels and Detroit Tigers. Machemer was most recently a special assignment scout for the Baltimore Orioles. Over his 11-season minor league playing career, he batted .277 with 1,078 hits in 1,126 games played.

Biography
Machemer was born in St. Joseph, Michigan. He attended Benton Harbor High School in Benton Harbor, Michigan where he was teammates with Don Hopkins.

His professional baseball career began in June 1972, when he was selected by the Angels in the fourth round of the amateur draft. He made his major-league debut at the age of 27 for the California Angels on June 21, 1978, playing second base and leading off against the Minnesota Twins. In his first major-league at-bat, versus Twins pitcher Geoff Zahn, Machemer hit a home run to deep left field, making him one of only 118 players in major-league history to homer in his first at-bat. That home run would prove to be his only major-league home run.  Machemer has recorded over 1,600 victories in 23 seasons since his managerial debut in 1985. He led the Stockton Ports to the California League championship in 1986 and guided the AZL Giants to their third league title in five years with a win over the AZL Angels on August 31, 2008.

Machemer also spent time as a minor league manager or coordinator with the Milwaukee Brewers (1985–91), Montreal Expos (1992–95) and the Orioles (1996–2002).

Machemer came to the San Francisco Giants' system in 2005 after working the previous three years with the Montreal Expos organization (2002–04). He was at Double-A Harrisburg in 2003–04 when he earned his 1,000th triumph on August 22, 2003.  With the Giants, Machemer guided the Double-A Norwich Navigators to a 71–71 record in 2005, then took the Connecticut Defenders to a 64–77 mark in 2006, and 41–58 ledger in 2007.

In 2008, the veteran minor league skipper returned for his fourth season with the Giants' organization, his first at the helm of the Arizona League Giants, a rookie-level team based in Scottsdale, Arizona. Machemer managed the previous three years at Double-A Connecticut. After winning the 2008 AZL championship, he was promoted to the Class A Augusta GreenJackets of the South Atlantic League (2009–10), then back to Double-A with the Richmond Flying Squirrels of the Eastern League (2011–13). Machemer then returned to the Baltimore organization in 2014 as a scout.

Other managerial stops have included: Double-A Bowie (2001), Class A Advanced Frederick (2000), Triple-A Rochester (1999), Class A Delmarva (1998), Double-A El Paso (1988 and 1996–97), Triple-A Denver (1989–90), Class A Advanced Stockton (1986–87) and Rookie-level Beloit (1985).

References

External links

1951 births
Living people
Baltimore Orioles scouts
Baseball players from Michigan
California Angels players
Central Michigan Chippewas baseball players
Detroit Tigers players
El Paso Diablos players
Evansville Triplets players
Major League Baseball second basemen
Minor league baseball managers
Quad Cities Angels players
Rhode Island Red Sox players
Rochester Red Wings managers
Rochester Red Wings players
Salinas Packers players
Salt Lake City Gulls players
Stockton Ports players
Tiburones de La Guaira players
American expatriate baseball players in Venezuela
Toledo Mud Hens players